Marisa Vernati (21 June 1920 – 1 February 1988) was an Italian actress.

Born in Rome, Vernati was helped by her aunt soprano Luisa Tetrazzini to enter the world of entertainment, starting with small roles in films directed by Raffaello Matarazzo and Camillo Mastrocinque. Her film career was mainly limited to stereotyped roles of "femme fatale" or seductress in sentimental melodramas and romantic comedies. Her career on stage was more successful, as Vernati was the prima donna in several successful revues, with the companies of Nino Taranto, Tino Scotti and Fanfulla, among others. In 1947, after her marriage to an Iranian doctor, she followed her husband who for professional reasons had to move to Turkey. Once returned, she resumed her activities in films, theater and radio, and then she retired to private life in the mid-1950s.

Selected filmography
 It Was I! (1937)
 Departure (1938)
 I Want to Live with Letizia (1938)
 Eternal Melodies (1940)
 Down with Misery (1945)
 Crime News (1947)
 My Beautiful Daughter (1950)
 Peppino e la vecchia signora (1954)

References

External links 
 

Italian film actresses
Italian stage actresses
Actresses from Rome
1920 births
1988 deaths
20th-century Italian actresses
People of Lazian descent